The rue de La Sourdière is a street in the 1st arrondissement of Paris, in France.

According to the French magazine "Challenges", it is one of the hundred most expensive streets in Paris.

During the French Revolution, Maximilien de Robespierre survived a riot by entering the church of Saint Roch (located in the rue Saint-Honoré) and taking a tunnel to 10 rue de la Sourdière.

Streets in the 1st arrondissement of Paris